Ronaldo Damus (born 12 September 1999) is a Haitian footballer who plays as a forward for San Diego Loyal on loan from GIF Sundsvall and the Haiti national team.

Career

Club 
Damus has played in the USL League One for North Texas SC. Damus signed for USL Championship club Orange County SC ahead of the 2021 season. On March 17, 2022, Orange County announced that they had transferred Damus to Allsvenskan club GIF Sundsvall.

International 
Damus has played internationally for Haiti at the youth and senior levels.

Honors

Club 
North Texas SC
USL Regular Season Champions: 2019
USL League One Playoff Champions: 2019

Orange County SC
USL Cup: 2021

Individual 
USL League One Golden Boot: 2019
USL League One All-League First Team: 2019
USL Cup Final MVP: 2021

References

External links 
 
 
 

1999 births
Living people
People from Hinche
Haitian footballers
Haiti international footballers
Haiti under-20 international footballers
Association football forwards
North Texas SC players
USL League One players
Orange County SC players
GIF Sundsvall players
San Diego Loyal SC players
Haitian expatriate footballers
Haitian expatriate sportspeople in the United States
Expatriate soccer players in the United States
Haitian expatriate sportspeople in Sweden
Expatriate footballers in Sweden
2021 CONCACAF Gold Cup players
Allsvenskan players